Valsamoggia is a comune in the Metropolitan City of Bologna, Emilia-Romagna, Italy. It was created on 1 January 2014 after the merger of the former communes of Bazzano (the current town hall seat), Castello di Serravalle, Crespellano, Monteveglio and Savigno.

The Italian painters, Alessandro Scorzoni and Antonino Sartini, were born in this municipality.

The frazione of Zappolino in the Middle Ages was the location of a battle between the communes of Modena and Bologna.

References